Sycon elegans is a species of calcareous sponges belonging to the family Sycettidae.

See also 
 List of sponges of Ireland

References 

Leucosolenida
Animals described in 1845